Ingolfiellidea is a small suborder of amphipods with only two families, Ingolfiellidae and Metaingolfiellidae. They are small, vermiform (worm-like) animals that live "in the soft mud of the deep-sea floor, as well as in high mountain freshwater river beds, or in subterranean fresh, brackish and marine interstitial waters of continental ground waters and continental shelves".

References

 
Amphipoda
Arthropod suborders